Mark Maclaine (sometimes known as The Silence) is a British educator, director, music producer, founder of Tutorfair and writer.  He is best known for his work as the bass guitarist and producer for the post trip-hop band Second Person. He was a co-founder of the UK hip-hop record label Dented Records and co-owner of a film company the Silence Corporation.

History
Maclaine started his career as a bass guitarist in London before eventually moving into music production. He began writing his own music under the name "The Silence". In April 2001, he started Dented Records with two members of a successful UK hip-hop group, Foreign Beggars.

In 2002, Maclaine formed the post trip-hop band Second Person with the singer and pianist Julia Johnson. They completed work on writing the music for the free-skiing trilogy 'Snow's in the House' and released their first album, Chromatography, in October 2004.

They went on to write the music score for British feature film City Rats, which was released in early 2009 and on DVD on 27 April 2009. In 2008, Maclaine produced (under his pseudonym "The Silence") the album Close to Home in New York City with the New Zealand rapper Maitreya. Two of the album's tracks were nominated for the APRA Silver Scroll Award for songwriting in New Zealand. Second Person released two further albums before parting company, after 10 years, in April 2011.

Maclaine spends much of his time tutoring but continues to produce music and videos for other artists. In 2010, he directed the music video "Questions in My Mind" by the Portuguese singer Ana Free in New York City. They worked together on two more videos, "Playgrounds and Kisses" and "Electrical Storm", both reaching number 1 in the MTV Portugal charts and filmed in Free's hometown of Lisbon and London respectively. His other work includes directing for the Africa Express project, filming their various guest musicians including Damon Albarn, Paul McCartney and John Paul Jones.

Family
Maclaine's father was the director Richard MacLaine and his mother is the photographer Tana Maclaine.

Selected film/theatre crew credits

 "In The Forest" : director (2013: short film)
 "Electrical Storm - Ana Free" : director/producer (2012: music video)
 "Playgrounds and Kisses – Ana Free" : director/producer (2011: music video)
 "Questions – Ana Free" : director/co-producer (2010: music video)
 "Underachievers" : director/co-writer (2010: short film) 
 "Living into the Future" : director/co-writer (2010: short film)
 "Dolores by Edward Allen Baker" : director (Feb 2010: theatre: Old Red Lion, London)
 "They Walk Among Us" : producer/editor (2010: short film)
 "Ladies' Man by Feydeau" : director (17 Jan 2010: theatre: Old Red Lion, London)
 "Burlesque Fairytales" : re-recording supervisor (2009: feature film – Double Barreled Productions)
 "Happy Birthday" : producer (2009: short film – People Can Run Films)
 "Amazon.com: Sellaband" : director/editor (2008: short documentary film – Amazon.com)
 "Cheap Escape – Fandangle" : director/editor (2008: music video – Party House Records: MTV, VH1 & Kerrang TV featured)
 "City Rats" : sound & music director (2008: feature film – cinema and international DVD release)
 "Wood – Second Person" : director/producer (2007: music video – MTV, VH1 & YouTube featured video)
 "Spilt Milk – Second Person" : director/producer (2007: music video – MTV, VH1 & YouTube featured video)
 "Live at the Bedford – Second Person" : director/producer (2006: DVD/CD – international release)
 "Extreme Beach Soccer" : supervising sound editor (2006: TV series – Extreme Sports Channel)
 "Streetball Extreme: Battle for Europe" : supervising sound editor (2006: TV series – Extreme Sports Channel)
 "Gumball 3000: Around the World in 8 Days" : post-sound recordist (2006: TV series – Extreme Sports Channel)
 "The Passenger" : supervising sound editor/re-recording mixer (2006: short film – various festival release with awards)
 "Dolls" : supervising sound editor (2006: short film – Cannes and festival release & BBC/SKY featured)
 "The L.A. Hardcore" : sound editor/re-recording mixer (2005: TV series – Extreme Sports Channel)
 "Downfall" : supervising sound editor (2005: short film – festival release)
 "Surf Breaks" : sound re-recordist (2005: TV series – Extreme Sports Channel)
 "Tricks & Tips" : sound re-recordist (2005: TV series – Extreme Sports Channel)
 "S.W.A.T." : supervising sound editor (2004: short film – festival release with awards)
 "Snows in the House 3" : music editor (2004: feature film – limited cinema and DVD release)
 "Ave Maria" : film editor (2004: short film – festival release)
 "Verbier Ride 2004" : music editor (2004: TV series – Channel 4/Extreme Sports Channel)
 "Capoeira: Brazil to London" : director/producer (2003: documentary film – film festival release)
 "Snows in the House 2" : music editor (2003: feature documentary film – limited cinema and DVD release)

Selected film music credits

 "Burlesque Fairytales" : music producer (2010: feature film 35mm – Double Barreled Productions)
 "City Rats" : composer (2008: feature film – cinema and international DVD release)
 "The Vanguard" : music producer/mixer (2008: feature film – Lionsgate Films: limited cinema & worldwide DVD release)
 "Wood – Second Person" : composer/music producer (2007: music video – MTV, VH1 & YouTube featured video)
 "Spilt Milk – Second Person" : composer/music producer (2007: music video – MTV, VH1 & YouTube featured video)
 "Live at the Bedford – Second Person" : music producer/mixer (2006: DVD/CD – international release)
 "Extreme Beach Soccer" : series theme composer (2006: TV series – Extreme Sports Channel)
 "Streetball Extreme: Battle for Europe" : composer/music producer (2006: TV series – Extreme Sports Channel)
 "Genex" : series theme composer (2006: TV series – Extreme Sports Channel)
 "The Passenger" : composer/music producer (2006: short film – various festival release with awards)
 "Dolls" : music producer/orchestral mixer (2006: short film – Cannes and festival release & BBC/SKY featured)
 "The L.A. Hardcore" : music editor (2005: TV series – Extreme Sports Channel)
 "S.W.A.T." : composer/music producer (2004: short film – festival release with awards)
 "Snows in the House 3" : composer/music producer (2004: feature film – limited cinema and DVD release)
 "Ave Maria" : composer/music producer (2004: short film – festival release)
 "Verbier Ride 2004" : composer/music producer (2004: TV series – Channel 4/Extreme Sports Channel)
 "Capoeira: Brazil to London" : composer/music producer (2003: documentary film – film festival release)
 "Snows in the House 2" : composer/music producer (2003: feature documentary film – limited cinema and DVD release)
 "Snows in the House" :  co-composer (2002: feature documentary film – limited cinema and DVD release)
 "Dreamless" : composer (2002: feature film)

Selected music/album credits

References

External links
 Mark Maclaine's daily blog
 Mark Maclaine interview, Time Magazine, 4 September 2008

British film directors
British record producers
Living people
Place of birth missing (living people)
1980 births